Rajinikanth is an Indian actor who has appeared in over 260 films, predominantly in Tamil cinema. He began his film career by playing antagonistic and supporting roles before graduating to a lead actor. After starring in numerous commercially successful films throughout the 1980s and 1990s, he has continued to hold a matinée idol status in the popular culture of Tamil Nadu. Writing for Slate, Grady Hendrix called him the "biggest movie star you've probably never heard of." Rajinikanth has also worked in other Indian film industries such as Hindi, Telugu, Kannada, Malayalam and Bengali.

He made his cinematic debut with K. Balachander's 1975 Tamil drama Apoorva Raagangal, in which he played a minor role of an abusive husband. He had his first major role in Balachander's Telugu drama film Anthuleni Katha (1976), and got his breakthrough in Tamil with Moondru Mudichu (1976)—also directed by Balachander. His style and mannerisms in the latter earned recognition from the audience. In 1977, he acted in 15 films, playing negative characters in most of them, including Avargal, 16 Vayathinile, Aadu Puli Attam and Gaayathri. He had positive roles in Kavikkuyil, the Kannada film Sahodarara Savaal, and the Telugu film Chilakamma Cheppindi, in which he played the protagonist for the first time in his career. His role as a failed lover in S. P. Muthuraman's Bhuvana Oru Kelvi Kuri (1977) won him critical acclaim. In 1978, he was cast as the main lead in the Tamil film Bairavi. The same year, he received critical acclaim for his roles in Mullum Malarum and Aval Appadithan; the former earned him a Tamil Nadu State Film Award Special Prize for Best Actor. He made his Malayalam cinema debut with I. V. Sasi's fantasy Allauddinum Albhutha Vilakkum (1979), an adaptation of a story from One Thousand and One Nights. By the end of the decade, he had worked in all South Indian languages and established a career in Tamil cinema.

He played dual roles in the action thriller Billa (1980), which was a remake of the Bollywood film Don (1978). It was his biggest commercial success to that point and gave him the action hero image. Murattu Kaalai released in 1980 was instrumental in establishing Rajinikanth as both an action hero and superstar. Balachander's Thillu Mullu (1981), the Tamil remake of the Bollywood film Gol Maal (1979), was Rajinikanth's first full-length comedy film. He played triple roles in the 1982 Tamil film Moondru Mugam, which earned him a special prize at the Tamil Nadu State Film Awards ceremony. The following year, he made his Bollywood debut with T. Rama Rao's Andhaa Kaanoon; it was among the top-grossing Bollywood films in 1983. Muthuraman's Nallavanukku Nallavan (1984) won him that year's Filmfare Award for Best Tamil Actor. In 1985, he portrayed the Hindu saint Raghavendra Swami in his 100th film Sri Raghavendrar, a box-office failure. In the latter half of the 1980s, he starred in several films in Tamil and Hindi, including Padikkadavan (1985), Mr. Bharath (1986), Bhagwaan Dada (1986), Velaikaran (1987), Guru Sishyan (1988) and Dharmathin Thalaivan (1988). During this time, he made his debut in American cinema with a supporting role in the mystery adventure film Bloodstone (1988), a box-office failure.

Rajinikanth continued to act in Bollywood, often playing supporting roles in films such as Hum, Khoon Ka Karz, and Phool Bane Angaray (all in 1991). Mani Ratnam's Tamil film Thalapathi (1991), based on the Indian epic Mahabharata, earned him critical acclaim. Suresh Krissna's Annaamalai (1992), P. Vasu's Mannan (1992) and Uzhaippali (1993) are among his box-office successes in Tamil. He made his debut as a screenwriter with Valli (1993), a commercial failure. The Suresh Krissna-directed  Baashha, in which he played a crime boss, was a major commercial success in his career and earned him a "demigod" status in Tamil Nadu. Later that year he acted in K. S. Ravikumar's Muthu, which was dubbed into Japanese. In Japan, the film grossed a record US$1.6 million in 1998 and was largely instrumental in creating a fan-base for Rajinikanth in the country. Padayappa (1999), his second collaboration with Ravikumar, went on to become the highest-grossing Tamil film to that point. In 2002 Rajinikanth produced, wrote and starred in the fantasy thriller Baba, which fell short of market expectations and incurred heavy losses for its distributors. After a three-year sabbatical, he returned to acting with the comedy horror film Chandramukhi (2005); it went on to become the highest-grossing Tamil film to that point, and its theatrical run lasted 126 weeks at Shanti Theatre in Chennai. Rajinikanth was paid 26 crore for his role in S. Shankar's Sivaji (2007), which made him the second-highest paid actor in Asia after Jackie Chan. He played dual roles, as a scientist and an andro-humanoid robot, in the science fiction film Enthiran (2010). It was India's most expensive production at the time of its release, and is among the highest-grossing Indian films of all time. He played triple roles in the 2014 animated film Kochadaiiyaan, the first in India to be shot with motion capture technology; it was a commercial failure. Two years later, Rajinikanth played a Malaysian Tamil crime boss in Pa. Ranjith's Kabali, which had the biggest weekend opening for an Indian film.

Filmography

See also 
 List of awards and nominations received by Rajinikanth

Notes

References

Bibliography

External links 
 

Rajinikanth
Indian filmographies
Male actor filmographies